Mithabel is a village in Gorakhpur district of the north-eastern part of the Indian state of Uttar Pradesh, India. It is close to the Nepal border. It has a 1000-years-old history. There are several accounts on the existence of this village however its ancestry can be traced back to the 18th century. According to 2011 Census, it has a population of 6965 according to 2011 census. Maximum people in village works in sugar factory. Approximately 2 or 3 member in one family worked in sugar factory. Manjeet dubey who is famous social worker was born here.

Brahmapur, another village nearby, is closely related to Mithabel. It is home to an ancient temple of a "Bramha", Shri Visheshwar Baba, who is one of the ancestors of the inhabitants of this village. There is an old story about this temple and its creation. Baba is considered a deity and a holy figure. The temple has long been a center of devotion for not only the inhabitants of this village but also the ones nearby.

History
Mithabel was a zamindari during British India belonging to the Dubeys, holding 29 villages.

References

Mithabel Zamindari

Report of Tour in the Gorakhpur District in 1875-76 and 1876-77, Vol. XVIII

Villages in Gorakhpur district